Hennepin is an unincorporated community along State Highway 7 in extreme southern Garvin County, Oklahoma, United States, near the point where Carter, Garvin and Murray counties intersect. Hennepin County was named for Father Louis Hennepin, a member of Lasalle's Louisiana Expedition.

Demographics

References

Further reading
Shirk, George H. "First Post Offices Within the Boundaries of Oklahoma". Chronicles of Oklahoma 26:2 (1948) 179–244. (accessed February 23, 2007)
Shirk, George H. Oklahoma Place Names. Norman: University of Oklahoma Press, 1987. .

Unincorporated communities in Garvin County, Oklahoma
Unincorporated communities in Oklahoma